Dalvíkurbyggð (regionally also ) is a small municipality in northern Iceland. Dalvíkurbyggð is on Tröllaskagi and west of Eyjafjörður.

History
The municipality of Dalvíkurbyggð was formed in 1998 by the merger of three districts of outer Eyjafjörður: the town of Dalvík and the rural districts of Svarfaðardalur and Árskógur . The logo of Dalvíkurbyggð shows three mountains, signifying the joining of the three communities.

Transportation
The main route in Dalvíkurbyggð is the one numbered 82. 
Dalvík harbor is a regional commercial port for import and fishing. The ferry Sæfari, which sails from Dalvík, serves the island of Grímsey, Iceland's northernmost community, which lies on the Arctic Circle.

Economy
The local economy is based upon fisheries and fish processing, in addition to various industrial and food enterprises, services, and increasingly hi tech industry. Dalvík is also a tourist destination for boat trips in whale watching and heli skiing.

Twin towns – sister cities

Dalvíkurbyggð is twinned with:
 Hamar, Norway
 Ittoqqortoormiit, Greenland
 Lund, Sweden
 Porvoo, Finland
 Viborg, Denmark

Notable natives
Kristján Eldjárn - President of Iceland 1968 - 1980
Björgvin Björgvinsson - alpine skier, has competed in FIS World Cup and Olympic Games.
Daníel Hilmarsson - alpine skier, won multiple national championships and participated in Olympic Games in Calgary.
Heiðar Helguson - Professional footballer with English Football League Championship team Queens Park Rangers.
Freymóður Jóhannsson - Painter and song composer.
Friðrik Ómar - Eurovision Song Contest 2008, member in the Icelandic group Euroband.
Gunnlaugur Lárusson - Electric guitarist and a founding member of the Icelandic band Brain Police.
Þórarinn Eldjárn, - author
Magni Þór Óskarsson - Winner of Gettu Betur in 2006 with Menntaskólinn á Akureyri
Johann K. Petursson - "The Viking Giant."

See also
Sæplast
Snorrason Holdings

References

External links

Dalvíkurbyggð Municipality
Bergmenn Mountain Guides - Iceland's only certified mountain guides BMG specialize in Heli Skiing, ski touring, ski mountaineering and ice climbing in the Dalvik region.
Fiskidagur - official site

 
1998 establishments in Iceland
Populated places in Northeastern Region (Iceland)
Municipalities of Iceland